Hope Amelia Stevens (born July 30, 1981) is an American former soccer goalkeeper. She was a goalkeeper for the United States women's national soccer team from 2000 to 2016, and is a World Cup champion and two-time Olympic gold medalist. After playing at the collegiate level for the University of Washington, she played professionally for the Philadelphia Charge in the Women's United Soccer Association (WUSA). When the WUSA folded after her first season, she traveled to Europe to play for the top division leagues in Sweden and France. From 2009 to 2011, she played in the Women's Professional Soccer (WPS) for Saint Louis Athletica, Atlanta Beat and magicJack. After the WPS ceased operations in early 2012, she played for the Seattle Sounders in the W-League. She most recently played for Seattle Reign FC in the National Women's Soccer League, the top division of women's soccer in the United States.

Solo is regarded as one of the top female goalkeepers of all time and currently holds the U.S. record for most career clean sheets. She was the starting goalkeeper for the majority of the 2007 FIFA Women's World Cup and helped lead the U.S. national team to the semifinals having given up only two goals in four games, including three consecutive shutouts. After a controversial move made by head coach Greg Ryan to bench Solo in favor of veteran goalkeeper Briana Scurry for the semifinal, in which the United States was defeated 4–0 by Brazil, Solo made headlines with post-game remarks that resulted in many teammates shunning her. She later rebounded to help the United States win gold medals at the 2008 and 2012 Summer Olympics. During the 2011 FIFA Women's World Cup, her exceptional skill was highlighted especially during a quarter-final match against Brazil, which the U.S. won on penalty kicks. Although the team lost to Japan in a match that ended in penalties, Solo received the Golden Glove award for best goalkeeper as well as the Bronze Ball award for her overall performance at the tournament.

Following her performance at the 2011 World Cup, Solo participated in the television show Dancing with the Stars and posed for various magazines, most notably the "Body Issue" of ESPN The Magazine. After the 2012 London Olympics, where she received her second Olympic gold medal, she published her bestselling autobiography Solo: A Memoir of Hope.

As the starting goalkeeper at the 2015 FIFA Women's World Cup, Solo helped the U.S. win the national team's third World Cup championship since 1991. The final against Japan was the most-watched televised soccer game ever in the United States.

, Solo holds several U.S. goalkeeper records including appearances (202), starts (190), wins (153), shutouts (102), wins in a season (26), consecutive minutes played (1,256), and longest undefeated streak (55 games).

Early life 

Solo was born in Richland, Washington on July 30, 1981, to Judy Lynn ( Shaw) and Jeffrey Solo. Her father, an Italian-American Vietnam War veteran, who was in and out of her life as a child and teenager, taught her how to play soccer at a young age. When Solo was seven, her father picked her and her brother Marcus up to go to a baseball game in the nearby city of Yakima, but ended up driving over three hours west to Seattle, where they stayed for several days at a hotel. Solo described how it seemed like a vacation at first, but soon realized it was not. Police later found them at a downtown bank and arrested Jeffrey for alleged kidnapping. Although her parents had divorced when she was six and she lived with her mother, Solo maintained a close relationship with her father after reconnecting with him during her college years at the University of Washington. He continued to be a major influence in her life until his death of a heart attack in June 2007.

As a forward at Richland High School, Solo scored 109 goals, leading her team to three consecutive league titles from 1996 to 1998 and a state championship during her senior year. She was twice named a Parade All American. Solo also played club soccer for the Three Rivers Soccer Club in the Tri-Cities.

Washington Huskies, 1999–2002

After being heavily recruited by several colleges around the country, Solo attended the University of Washington from 1999 to 2002 where she majored in speech communications. With the Huskies, she switched permanently to goalkeeper under the lead of head coach Lesle Gallimore and goalkeeper coach and former national team player, Amy Griffin. Solo described the transition in her memoir, "In high school, I had been the forward who won games. It was a huge mental adjustment to learn that my job was to save games. To anticipate what was needed. Before, I would stand in goal, the ball would come toward me, and I'd use my athletic ability to make the save. But thanks to Amy's tutelage and my time with the national team, I was becoming a much better tactical goalkeeper. I learned how to read my opponents' runs toward goal, how to position my defenders, how to see the angles... The intellectual side also made goalkeeping so much more interesting. It wasn't just ninety minutes of waiting for my defense to make a mistake. It was ninety minutes of tactics and strategy. The personality traits that had been shaped by my childhood—resilience and toughness—were assets at the position."

Solo became the top goalkeeper in Pac-10 history and finished her collegiate career as Washington's all-time leader in shutouts (18), saves (325) and goals against average (GAA) (1.02). She was a four-time All-Pac-10 selection and was named an NSCAA All-American as a sophomore, junior and senior. During her sophomore year, Solo was named Pac-10 Player of the Year becoming the first Washingtonian and first goalkeeper ever to receive the award. As a senior, she was the only goalkeeper nominated for the Hermann Trophy.

Club career

WUSA and European professional leagues, 2003–05 

Following her college career, Solo was selected in the first round (fourth overall) of the 2003 WUSA Draft by the Philadelphia Charge. She spent most of her first professional season on the bench playing in eight games. Solo started the last three games of the season and earned her first professional shutout against the Atlanta Beat. She also shut out eventual league champions, the Washington Freedom led by top scorers, Mia Hamm and Abby Wambach. After the WUSA folded following the 2003 season just six days before the 2003 FIFA Women's World Cup, Solo moved to Göteborg, Sweden in February 2004 to play for Kopparbergs/Göteborg FC in the Swedish Premier Division, the top division of women's soccer in Sweden. For ten months, she played in two games a week, making 19 appearances in goal for Göteborg in 2004. In 2005, she played for Olympique Lyonnais in the French First Division. She made seven appearances for the French club. Solo said of her experience in Europe, "I played in Europe and it was a great experience, not just because of my teammates and the coaches we had, but from the fans and the city itself – I played in Gothenburg and I played in Lyon and soccer was everywhere. At that time in my life, it really jump-started my career and really helped me find myself as a person and player."

The WPS years, 2009–11

Saint Louis Athletica 

On September 16, 2008, Solo was one of three national team players allocated to the Saint Louis Athletica in the WPS as part of the 2008 WPS Player Allocation, with the new league slated to begin play in April 2009. Solo let in six goals in the first four games as Athletica got off to a very slow 0–2–2 start in their first season. She conceded eight goals in her next 13 games and finished the season with eight shutouts, helping lead the Athletica from the bottom of the standings to finish second place and secure a playoff spot.

After the 2009 season, Solo was named the WPS Goalkeeper of the Year. She also became the first goalkeeper to be named U.S. Soccer Female Athlete of the Year, the highest honor awarded to a soccer player in the United States.

Atlanta Beat 

In May 2010, the Saint Louis Athletica folded and Solo signed with WPS expansion team, Atlanta Beat, along with her St. Louis teammates, Tina Ellertson and Eniola Aluko. As her previous jersey number was taken (1), she wore 78 for the Beat. Solo's comments on social networking website Twitter led to two separate controversies after she accused Boston Breakers supporters of offensive chanting and racist remarks toward a teammate, then questioned the integrity of match officials and the league itself following the Beat's 1–0 defeat to Washington Freedom.  The second outburst resulted in a $2,500 fine and one-game suspension.

Solo played in 22 WPS matches in 2010 for both the Athletica and the Beat and was the league-leader in saves with 104. The two-time WPS All-Star also ranked among the top three in shutouts (6), wins (6), and goals against average (1.64). After the end of the 2010 season, Solo underwent surgery on her right shoulder on September 22. "These next two years are huge for the national team with the World Cup and Olympics on the horizon and I wanted to make sure that I would be giving my team and my country my best on the field," Solo said of the surgery. "I've been having some painful issues with the shoulder for a while and for a goalkeeper it's been difficult physically and mentally to play with this kind of an injury, so it was time to get it taken care of."

magicJack 

Ahead of the 2011 Women's Professional Soccer season, Solo signed for magicJack, formerly the Washington Freedom under new ownership. Between her shoulder surgery recovery, national team commitments and preparation for the 2011 FIFA Women's World Cup, Solo missed a significant part of the season. She made four appearances for the club, tallying a total of 360 minutes. After the season ended, the club lost its franchise on October 25, 2011. The league later suspended operations in early 2012 because of legal and financial difficulties.

Seattle Sounders Women, 2012 

On February 14, 2012, it was announced that Solo had signed with the Seattle Sounders Women. Joining the club the same year were national teammates Alex Morgan, Megan Rapinoe, and Sydney Leroux. Sounders Women general manager, Amy Carnell, said of the signing, "Hope is undoubtedly the best women's keeper in the game today. Her signing represents the caliber player Sounders Women's fans can expect in 2012. As the landscape of women's soccer continues to evolve, we realize the unique opportunity before us." Because of national team commitments and preparation for the 2012 Summer Olympics, Solo made three appearances for the club, tallying a total of 261 minutes. Her goals against average was 0.344, she made five saves and had one shutout. With the addition of Solo and her national team teammates, the Sounders sold out nine of their ten home matches at Starfire Stadium (capacity: 4,500). The average attendance during league matches was four times higher than the second most attended team in the league.

NWSL: a new era, 2013–2016

Seattle Reign FC 

On January 19, 2013, it was announced that Solo was one of three members from the United States national team, along with Megan Rapinoe and Amy Rodriguez, allocated to the Seattle Reign FC for the inaugural season of the National Women's Soccer League, as part of the NWSL Player Allocation. Two months later, it was reported that she was undergoing wrist surgery and would miss about half the season because of recovery. Joining news that Amy Rodriguez would be out for the season because of pregnancy and Megan Rapinoe would be returning mid-season after a six-month stint for Olympique Lyonnais, the Reign faced a tough first half of the season and went 0–9–1 in their first ten games. With the return of Solo, Rapinoe, and some additional lineup changes made during the early summer, the Reign turned their regular season record around and finished the season in seventh place with a 5–14–3 record. Solo started in all 14 matches in which she played with a 1.357 goals against average. She made 81 saves and tallied 1,260 minutes in goal.

In October 2013 Solo was linked with a transfer to English club Manchester City. Despite the relatively high salary reportedly offered by Manchester, Reign FC coach Laura Harvey expected Solo to return to the NWSL for 2014, to safeguard her place in the national team.

Solo returned to the Reign for the 2014 season. The team set a league record unbeaten streak of 16 games during the first part of the season. During the 16 game stretch, the Reign compiled a 13–0–3 record. The Reign finished first in the regular season clinching the NWSL Shield for the first time. After defeating the Washington Spirit 2–1 in the playoff semi-finals, the Reign were defeated 2–1 by FC Kansas City during the championship final. Following the regular season, Solo and Reign defenders Lauren Barnes and Stephanie Cox were named to the Second XI team. Solo finished the 2014 season with 65 saves in 20 games played and a .900 goals against average.

Solo made eight appearances for Seattle during the 2016 season before joining the national team at the 2016 Rio Olympics. After US Soccer suspended Solo and terminated her national team contract in August 2016 for saying that the Sweden women's national football team "played like cowards," she was granted "personal leave" by the Reign for the remainder of the NWSL season. She finished the season with a 0.63 GAA and 81% save percentage, including five clean sheets.

International career 

Solo played for U.S. junior national soccer teams before joining the senior U.S. national team in 2000. Her senior debut came in an 8–0 win over Iceland at Davidson, North Carolina, in April 2000. In 2004, Solo joined the national team at the 2004 Summer Olympics in Athens as an alternate behind primary goalkeeper Briana Scurry and backup Kristin Luckenbill. Solo has been the team's first choice goalkeeper since 2005. She holds the national team record for longest undefeated streak as a goalkeeper with 55 games from March 7, 2002, to July 16, 2008.

2007 FIFA Women's World Cup 

Solo was the starting goalkeeper for the United States in the 2007 FIFA Women's World Cup, giving up two goals in four games including consecutive shutouts of Sweden, Nigeria and England. Heading into the semifinal match against Brazil, U.S. coach Greg Ryan benched Solo in favor of 36-year-old veteran U.S. keeper Briana Scurry, who had a strong history of performance against the Brazilians but had not played a complete game in three months. The U.S. lost to Brazil 4–0, ending a 51–game (regulation time) undefeated streak, while playing much of the match with only 10 players after midfielder Shannon Boxx was sent off after receiving two yellow cards in the first half.

Post-2007 World Cup fallout 

In an impromptu interview following the match, a clearly upset Solo criticized Ryan's decision. "It was the wrong decision, and I think anybody that knows anything about the game knows that. There's no doubt in my mind I would have made those saves. And the fact of the matter is it's not 2004 anymore. It's not 2004. And it's 2007, and I think you have to live in the present. And you can't live by big names. You can't live in the past. It doesn't matter what somebody did in an Olympic gold medal game in the Olympics three years ago. Now is what matters, and that's what I think." Many viewed her comments as being critical of Scurry's performance, although Solo released an apologetic statement the following day saying that was not her intent. On September 29, 2007, coach Greg Ryan announced that Solo would not be with the team and would not play in the third-place match against Norway the following day. Team captain Kristine Lilly stated that the decision on Solo was made by the team as a group. The U.S. went on to win against Norway 4–1.

Solo was named to the U.S. women's national soccer team roster for the post-World Cup tour, but did not attend the first workout ahead of the first game against Mexico. Even though the players' contract with the federation stipulated that anyone on the World Cup roster had the right to play in the tour, she did not play in any of the three games against Mexico, being replaced by Briana Scurry for the first and third matches, and Nicole Barnhart for the second. The third match against Mexico, on October 20, 2007, marked the end of the U.S. women's national team's 2007 season. The team regrouped in January 2008 to begin preparations for the 2008 Summer Olympics. Ryan left the team after his contract was not renewed in December 2007.

2008 Summer Olympics 

On June 23, 2008, it was announced Solo would be the starting goalkeeper for the U.S. team at the 2008 Summer Olympics in Beijing. In a reversal of roles from the 2004 Olympics, Briana Scurry did not make the team, though she was an alternate. On August 21, the U.S. women's team won the gold medal by defeating Brazil 1–0 in extra time, in no small measure due to Solo's performance as she stopped an energetic Brazilian attack, making save after save. After the team won gold, Solo appeared on NBC Today Show, and she stated in a 2012 article appearing in ESPN The Magazine that she was drunk while on air. "When we were done partying, we got out of our dresses, got back into our stadium coats and, at 7 a.m. with no sleep, went on the Today show drunk."

2011 FIFA Women's World Cup 

Despite missing much of the qualifying campaign with a shoulder injury, Solo was named to the U.S. roster for the 2011 FIFA Women's World Cup in Germany. After keeping clean sheets in group C wins over North Korea and Colombia, Solo conceded two goals in the 2–1 loss to Sweden which consigned the Americans to second place in the group and a quarterfinal meeting with Brazil.

The quarterfinal match between the U.S. and Brazil was sent into a penalty shoot-out after U.S. forward Abby Wambach tied the game at 2–2 in stoppage time at the end of extra-time. Solo saved the third Brazil penalty kick by Daiane, helping the U.S. secure a semifinal spot against France. After the quarterfinal victory, Solo commented on the performance and spirit of the U.S. players during the match, "Even when we were a player down and a goal behind in extra time, you sensed that something was going to happen", and added that "[the] team kept fighting. You can't teach that. It's a feeling – and we play with that feeling."

Solo became the twenty-seventh American woman and second goalkeeper to reach 100 caps with her start in the 3–1 semifinal win over France. Talking to the media after the match, Solo reflected upon the tournament so far, "It was a hard-fought road [...] It hasn't been easy, but this is where we expected to be. We came this far, we better go all the way."

In the final, the U.S. team lost 3–1 in a penalty shootout to Japan, after twice taking the lead in an eventual 2–2 draw. Solo expressed admiration for the Japanese team and offered her congratulations. Solo won the Golden Glove award for best goalkeeper, and the Bronze Ball award for her overall performance. She was also featured in the "All-star" team of the tournament.

2012 Summer Olympics 

Leading up to the Summer Olympics, Solo received a public warning from the U.S. Anti-Doping Agency (USADA) after a June 15 urine test concluded the banned substance canrenone had been detected. Solo said in a statement she had been prescribed a pre-menstrual medication and was not aware it contained any banned substances. She cooperated with the USADA and provided them with the necessary information to prove that it was a mistake. Her story checked out and she was cleared with a public warning. The positive test did not require Solo to withdraw from any pre-Olympic matches.

In a 4–2 defeat of France in the opening match, France took an early 2–0 lead in 15 minutes. After Abby Wambach reduced the lead to 2–1 with a 19th-minute header off a Megan Rapinoe corner kick, Solo assisted Alex Morgan at the 32nd minute to score and level the match at 2–2; she took a free-kick sending the ball to Morgan, who kicked the ball after a bounce, over goalkeeper Sarah Bouhaddi into the goal.

On August 9, Solo won her second Olympic gold medal with the United States women's national soccer team. In a 2–1 defeat of Japan in the final match, Solo made many saves, including an 82nd-minute save of a shot from Mana Iwabuchi, which could have tied the match.

Solo kept three clean sheets, two in group-stage against Colombia with 3–0 and Korea DPR with 1–0, and a 2–0 win against New Zealand in the quarter-final.
She conceded 6 goals, 3 in the aforementioned matches against France and Japan. Three goals were conceded to Christine Sinclair in the semi-final, a 4–3 extra-time last-minute win against Canada. Along with defenders Christie Rampone and Kelley O'Hara, Solo was one of three players on the United States team who played all 570 minutes during the team's six matches.

2013–2014 

In March 2013, Solo underwent surgery to repair a long-standing injury in her left wrist and did not play for approximately three months. She returned to the national team in June. The team finished 2013 undefeated in 16 games, with 13 wins.

On June 14, 2014, Solo tied the U.S. record for career shutouts with 71 after the team defeated France 1–0 during a friendly match in Tampa, Florida. The record was previously set by retired goalkeeper, Briana Scurry. A few months later on September 13, she set a new record with her 72nd shutout in a friendly match against Mexico that resulted in an 8–0 win for the United States. On January 21, 2015, Solo was suspended by the national team for thirty days, due to an undisclosed incident at a training camp.

2015 FIFA Women's World Cup 
In April 2015, Solo was named to the U.S. roster for the 2015 FIFA Women's World Cup in Canada by head coach Jill Ellis. Solo started and played all possible minutes (630) in all seven of the U.S.' matches, and the U.S. won the tournament, with record-breaking television viewership that topped 750 million in-home TV viewers.  After giving up a goal in the 27th minute of the team's first group stage match against Australia, Solo made three crucial saves in the same match that kept her team "in the game". Her performance earned praise from her teammates and coach. She had a 540-minute shutout streak, the second longest in tournament history, and allowed three goals throughout the tournament.

During the semi-final match against top-ranked Germany, she used stalling tactics to try to put the tournament's high scorer, Célia Šašić, off her rhythm at a penalty kick. Šašić missed the penalty kick, which kept the game scoreless. This marked the first time a German team, men's or women's, missed a penalty in a World Cup. She ended the tournament with 177 international caps and received the Golden Glove trophy as the best goalkeeper.

2016: 100th shutout 

On July 9, 2016, Solo earned her 100th international shutout, 150th career win, and 197th cap in a friendly game against South Africa at Soldier Field, Chicago, Illinois. This made Solo the first ever female goalkeeper in history to achieve 100 shutouts in international competition.

2016 Rio Olympics  

On the occasion of her 200th cap, Solo made "several fine saves" as the United States beat France 1–0, to follow up their opening 2–0 win over New Zealand. In the final group fixture against Colombia, Solo made two errors which allowed their lowly-ranked opponents to secure a 2–2 draw. During the United States' matches Solo had been jeered by the Brazilian crowds, who also chanted "Zika" at her when she touched the ball, in response to her pre-tournament contributions to the 2015–16 Zika virus epidemic debate.

Solo attracted more controversy in the United States' quarter-final defeat by Sweden. During the penalty shootout she caused an interruption of several minutes when changing her gloves before Sweden's final kick, in an apparent act of gamesmanship. Lisa Dahlkvist was seen to laugh at Solo's antics, before converting the penalty to eliminate the United States. Following the match Solo called her opponents "a bunch of cowards" in reference to their ultra-defensive tactics. The remark was made to Grant Wahl in the raw aftermath of the defeat.  The International Olympic Committee called Solo's comments "disappointing" but said she was unlikely to face formal disciplinary action adding "People are free to say those things. We wouldn't stop their right to express themselves, within boundaries, obviously." Swedish coach Pia Sundhage was more blunt in her assessment: "I don't give a crap. I'm going to Rio, she's going home" and later said, "I think she was just stressed, and that she did not really mean it." Swedish players, Lotta Schelin, Lisa Dahlkvist and Kosovare Asllani voiced their empathy for Solo chalking her comment up to being caught up in the heat of the moment.

 On August 24, 2016, US Soccer suspended Solo for six months and terminated her national team contract, making it her second suspension from the USWNT. The governing body said that Solo's previous misconduct had influenced its decision. Solo reacted angrily, saying that her comments had been used as a pretext to force her out, due to her prominent role in the national team's campaign for equal pay. Teammate Megan Rapinoe speculated that Solo's termination was "probably some legal strategy" on the part of US Soccer. In announcing a legal challenge to US Soccer's action, the players' lawyer Rich Nichols termed it: "excessive, unprecedented, disproportionate, and a violation of Ms. Solo's First Amendment rights."

Honors and awards

High school 

 Parade Magazine All-American: 1997, 1998
 Washington State Championship: 1998

College 

 NSCAA All-American: 2000, 2001, 2002
 Pac-10 Selection: 1999, 2000, 2001, 2002

Club 

 NWSL Shield: 2014
 WPS Goalkeeper of the Year: 2009

International 

 United States
 Olympic Gold Medal: 2008, 2012
 CONCACAF Women's Olympic Qualifying Tournament: 2008, 2012, 2016
 FIFA Women's World Cup Champion: 2015Runner-up: 2011
 Algarve Cup: 2005, 2007, 2008, 2010, 2011, 2013, 2015
 SheBelieves Cup: 2016
 Four Nations Tournament: 2006, 2007, 2008
 CONCACAF Women's Championship: 2006, 2014

Individual 
 U.S. Soccer Female Athlete of the Year: 2009
 FIFA Women's World Cup Golden Glove: 2011, 2015
 FIFA Women's World Cup Bronze ball: 2011
 FIFA Women's World Cup All-Star Team: 2011, 2015
 CONCACAF Women's Championship Golden Glove: 2014
 CONCACAF Women's Goalkeeper of the Year: 2015
 SheBelieves Cup Golden Glove: 2016
 FIFPro: FIFA FIFPro World XI 2015 2016
 IFFHS World's Best Woman Goalkeeper: 2012, 2013, 2014, 2015
 NWSL Second XI: 2014
 IFFHS World's Woman Team of the Decade 2011–2020
 IFFHS CONCACAF Woman Team of the Decade 2011–2020

Other 

 Do Something Award – Athlete: 2012
 Phoenix Mercury Woman of Inspiration: 2012
 Hall of Game She's Got Game Award: 2012
 Sports Spectacular Female Athlete of the Year: 2013

Personal life 
Solo is married to former American football player Jerramy Stevens. They have been together since mid-August 2012 when Solo returned from the Olympics. On November 12, 2012, Stevens was arrested on investigation of assault following an altercation that left Solo injured. The following day, Stevens was released after a judge determined there was not enough evidence to hold him. The couple were wed the next day. In December 2019, Solo announced that she and Stevens were expecting twins. The couple welcomed Vittorio Genghis and Lozen Orianna Judith Stevens on March 4, 2020.

In 2014, Solo was one of the victims of the iCloud leaks of celebrity photos, during which several nude pictures of her were leaked online. She expressed solidarity with the other women affected and criticized the perpetrators, "This act goes beyond the bounds of human decency".

Arrests 
On June 21, 2014, Solo was arrested and charged with two misdemeanor counts of assault in the fourth degree; one against her half-sister and the other against her nephew. She was booked under her married name of Hope Amelia Stevens. After pleading not guilty, she was released the following day. Her trial was scheduled for November 4, 2014, but was later delayed until January 20, 2015. On December 30, 2014, the judge ordered more depositions from the defendants and delayed a decision on whether charges against Solo would be dropped until January 6, 2015.

Following her arrest, Solo sat out one game for the Reign and the NWSL allowed her to continue playing soccer through the end of the 2014 season. There was some debate in the media about whether this exemplified a double standard in professional American sports after pro football players Ray Rice and Adrian Peterson had been suspended by the National Football League after Rice was shown in a previously undisclosed video assaulting his wife in a hotel elevator and Peterson was indicted by a grand jury on a felony charge of child abuse.  Senator Richard Blumenthal (D – Conn.) sent out a sternly worded letter to U.S. Soccer president Sunil Gulati admonishing the organization for allowing Solo to remain on the World Cup roster following her arrest and accused them of inadequately addressing the charges of domestic violence.

On January 13, 2015, the judge dismissed the charges against Solo based on a lack of cooperation from both alleged victims. However, prosecutors filed an appeal with the Superior Court of Washington. In October 2015, the prosecution prevailed in the Superior Court and the charges were reinstated. In June 2016, the state appeals court denied Solo's petition to review the case. On May 24, 2018, the city of Kirkland dismissed all domestic violence charges against her. Attorney Melissa Osman, who represents the city, wrote in court documents the circumstances of the case were "unlikely to recur", and prosecution witnesses did not want to testify.

On January 19, 2015, her husband Jerramy Stevens was arrested in Manhattan Beach, California, for suspicion of DUI. Stevens was driving the U.S. Soccer team van. As a result of this incident, Solo was suspended for thirty days from the U.S. Soccer team for showing poor judgement in entering the car and arguing with the police. In May, Stevens was sentenced to 30 days in jail and four years' probation for driving the U.S. soccer team van while drunk. The judge also mandated a two-year outpatient alcohol program. Stevens had refused a blood or breathalyzer test; officers had to obtain a search warrant to draw a blood sample; his blood-alcohol concentration was at least 0.15%.

On March 31, 2022, Solo was arrested for driving while intoxicated, resisting arrest, and misdemeanor child abuse. Her two-year-old twins were in her car when she was arrested in a Walmart parking lot in Winston-Salem, North Carolina.

Endorsements 

Solo has signed endorsement deals with Seiko, Simple Skincare, Nike, BlackBerry, Ubisoft, Electronic Arts, and Gatorade. In July 2011, she signed a one-year endorsement deal with Bank of America. In September 2011, she starred in an EA Sports television commercial along with professional basketball player Steve Nash, promoting FIFA 12. In the same month, she co-starred with national teammate Alex Morgan in a television commercial promoting ESPN's SportsCenter. In 2014, she was featured in a promotional piece for Western Union. Solo signed with LX Ventures, Inc. and Mobio as a "social media influencer" in March 2014. In June 2016, she partnered with Organically Raw to promote their Shanti Bar line of energy and protein bars.

Philanthropy 

Solo is a representative of the Women's Sports Foundation, an organization founded by Billie Jean King that is dedicated to "advancing the lives of girls and women through sports and physical activity." She has donated her time and money to the Boys and Girls Club and made appearances at numerous charity events. In August 2011, she joined teammates Alex Morgan and Abby Wambach in a Bank of America charitable campaign at the Chicago Marathon, as $5,000 was donated to Seattle Humane Society on her behalf. In 2012, Solo was one of 15 professional athletes including Shaun Phillips, Tim Lincecum, Ray Rice and others who participated in Popchips' Game Changers program. She made appearances at several charity events and money was donated to a local charity that she selected.

In popular culture

Television and film 

In 2011, Solo was a contestant on the 13th season of the Dancing with the Stars television series. Her partner was Maksim Chmerkovskiy and they were eliminated in the semifinal round, placing fourth overall in the competition.

She has made appearances on The Late Show with David Letterman, Piers Morgan Tonight, Late Night with Jimmy Fallon, The Ellen DeGeneres Show, Chelsea Lately, and Whitney. Solo was the focus of an ESPN E:60 episode in 2012. During her interview by Jeremy Schaap, she told of her experience at the 2007 World Cup as well as her childhood. In 2013, she was featured in the PBS documentary, Makers: Women Who Make America and ESPN documentary series, Nine for IX. The Nine for IX documentary, Branded, in which Solo appeared focused on the marketing of female professional athletes and the double standard that they often face with more value placed on beauty rather than their athletic excellence. Branded received the highest viewership of all of the documentaries in the series.

In 2016, Solo starred with teammates Megan Rapinoe and Crystal Dunn in a docu-series called Keeping Score broadcast by Fullscreen. The episodes followed the athletes as they prepared for the 2016 Rio Olympics and addressed issues such as equal pay and racism. The season's final episode showed her reaction after learning she had been suspended from the national team.

In February 2017, Solo signed on to serve as host for the sports medical television series, The Cutting Edge. The same month, she was featured on 60 Minutes Sports.

In June 2017 Solo appeared alongside Eric Cantona in a whimsical Eurosport promo segment, in which she was presented as the network's "Commissioner of Women's Football". Solo worked for the BBC as a pundit at the 2019 FIFA Women's World Cup.

Magazines 

Solo has been featured on the covers of Fitness, Sports Illustrated, Newsweek, TV Guide, Seattle Metropolitan Magazine, and Vogue. In 2011, she appeared nude in The Body Issue of ESPN The Magazine. Of the experience, she said, "I'm an athlete—that's all I am. If a sex symbol is now a top female athlete, I think that's pretty amazing and it shows how far our country has come from the stick-thin models, from what you see in most magazines."

Autobiography 

On August 14, 2012, after the London Olympics, Solo released her autobiography Solo: A Memoir of Hope co-authored with sports columnist and commentator Ann Killion and published by HarperCollins. In her book she provided her accounts of incidents with former U.S. national coach Greg Ryan, and her Dancing with the Stars''' partner Maksim Chmerkovskiy. She recounted her integration into the U.S. team with established players like Mia Hamm, Brandi Chastain, and Julie Foudy. Solo also revealed details of her early life. The autobiography debuted at number three on The New York Times Best Seller list in the hardcover non-fiction category—the highest ever for a book about soccer.

Video games
Solo is featured along with her national teammates in the EA Sports' FIFA video game series starting in FIFA 16, the first time women players were included in the game. In September 2015, she was ranked by EA Sports as the #8 women's player in the game.

Ticker tape parade and White House honor
Following the United States' win at the 2015 FIFA Women's World Cup, Solo and her teammates became the first women's sports team to be honored with a ticker tape parade in New York City. Each player received a key to the city from Mayor Bill de Blasio. In October of the same year, the team was honored by President Barack Obama at the White House.

 See also 
 List of FIFA Women's World Cup winning players
 FIFA Women's World Cup awards
 List of Olympic medalists in football
 List of women's footballers with 100 or more caps
 List of University of Washington alumni
 List of sportswomen

 References 

Notes

 Further reading 

 Solo, Hope (2012), Solo: A Memoir of Hope, Harper & Collins, 
 Lisi, Clemente A. (2010), The U.S. Women's Soccer Team: An American Success Story, Scarecrow Press, 
 Grainey, Timothy (2012), Beyond Bend It Like Beckham: The Global Phenomenon of Women's Soccer, University of Nebraska Press, 
 Stevens, Dakota (2011), A Look at the Women's Professional Soccer Including the Soccer Associations, Teams, Players, Awards, and More'', BiblioBazaar,

External links

 
 
 US Soccer player profile
 Washington player profile
 Atlanta Beat (WPS) player profile

1981 births
Living people
2007 FIFA Women's World Cup players
2011 FIFA Women's World Cup players
2015 FIFA Women's World Cup players
American memoirists
American people of Italian descent
American women's soccer players
Atlanta Beat (WPS) players
Damallsvenskan players
Expatriate women's footballers in France
Expatriate women's footballers in Sweden
Female models from Washington (state)
FIFA Century Club
FIFA Women's World Cup-winning players
Footballers at the 2008 Summer Olympics
Footballers at the 2012 Summer Olympics
Footballers at the 2016 Summer Olympics
BK Häcken FF players
MagicJack (WPS) players
Medalists at the 2008 Summer Olympics
Medalists at the 2012 Summer Olympics
National Women's Soccer League players
Olympic gold medalists for the United States in soccer
Olympique Lyonnais Féminin players
Parade High School All-Americans (girls' soccer)
People from Richland, Washington
Saint Louis Athletica players
OL Reign players
Seattle Sounders Women players
Soccer players from Washington (state)
United States women's international soccer players
Washington Huskies women's soccer players
Women's association football goalkeepers
Olympic soccer players of the United States
Division 1 Féminine players
American women memoirists
BBC sports presenters and reporters
Women sports commentators
Sports commentators
Women association football commentators
Association football commentators
Women's Professional Soccer players
National Soccer Hall of Fame members
Philadelphia Charge players
Women's United Soccer Association players